This partial list of city nicknames in Vermont compiles the aliases, sobriquets and slogans that cities, towns, and villages in Vermont are known by (or have been known by historically), officially and unofficially, to municipal governments, local people, outsiders or their tourism boards or chambers of commerce. City nicknames can help in establishing a civic identity, helping outsiders recognize a community or attracting people to a community because of its nickname; promote civic pride; and build community unity. Nicknames and slogans that successfully create a new community "ideology or myth" are also believed to have economic value. Their economic value is difficult to measure, but there are anecdotal reports of cities that have achieved substantial economic benefits by "branding" themselves by adopting new slogans.

Some unofficial nicknames are positive, while others are derisive. The unofficial nicknames listed here have been in use for a long time or have gained wide currency.
 Barre – Granite Capital of the World.Zezima, Kate "Headstones Too Go Global, and One City Pays the Price", The New York Times, October 25, 2006, accessed April 15, 2007. "Barre, Vt. — This city of 9,000 bills itself as the “granite capital of the world,” its economic foundation built early in the last century with the light gray rock from nearby quarries."
 Burlington
 The Queen City.Montpelier Wants a Nickname , WCAX-TV, April 17, 2009: "Burlington is known as the Queen City; Winooski is the Onion City and Montpelier... well the capital is looking for a nickname..."
 The People's Republic of Burlington (used when Bernie Sanders was mayor).
B-town
 Rutland
 The Marble City.Barna, Ed. "Rutland area continues broad economic expansion", Vermont Business Magazine, June 1, 2001, accessed April 15, 2007. "The extraction industry, historically important for a place nicknamed the Marble City, made headlines due to the OMYA marble grinding company's efforts to help meet a surging worldwide demand for calcium carbonate."
 RutVegas.
 St. Albans – Rail City.
 White River Junction – River City
 Winooski – The Onion City
Wallingford - Wally World

See also
List of city nicknames in the United States

References

Vermont cities and towns
Populated places in Vermont
City nicknames